The Armenian Synchronized Swimming Federation, also known as the Artistic Swimming Federation of Armenia, is the regulating body of synchronized swimming in Armenia, governed by the Armenian Olympic Committee. The headquarters of the federation are located in Yerevan.

History
The Armenian Synchronized Swimming Federation was established in 1996 and the current president is Anahit Tavrizyan. The Federation oversees the training of synchronized swimmers. Armenian synchronized swimmers participate in various European and international level synchronized swimming competitions. The Federation also organizes the "Republican Synchronized Swimming Championships", held in the Aqualand sports and health complex in Yerevan. The Federation cooperates with the Armenian Swimming Federation.

See also
 Armenian Diving Federation
 Sport in Armenia
 Water Polo Federation of Armenia

References 

Sport in Armenia
Synchronized swimming
Sports governing bodies in Armenia